Princess Fadia of Egypt (15 December 1943 – 28 December 2002) was born at the Abdeen Palace in Cairo. She was the youngest daughter of the late the Former King Farouk of Egypt and his first & last love, the Queen Farida. After her father was deposed during the Egyptian Revolution of 1952, the Princess lived in Italy for two years. She and her sisters were then sent to live in Switzerland, to attend boarding school. There, the Princess studied painting, became an accomplished equestrian and met her future husband.

On 17 February 1965, Fadia married Pierre Alexievitch Orloff (born 13 December 1938), a geologist and descendant of the Russian Royal Family, at the Kensington Registry Office, in London. He converted to Islam, taking the name Sa'id Orloff. They had two sons, Mikhail-Shamel (born 2 September 1966) and Alexander-Ali (born 30 July 1969). The Princess worked as a translator for the Swiss Ministry of Tourism, being fluent in French, Arabic, English, Italian and Spanish.

The Princess was the nearest one to her Father Farouk of Egypt and her great Mother Farida of Egypt ..

Princess Fadia of Egypt has 4 grandchildren.

Fadia died in Lausanne, Switzerland and was buried in the Al-Rifa'i Mosque in Cairo, Egypt.

Ancestors

References

Egyptian princesses
Farouk of Egypt
1943 births
2002 deaths
Swiss women artists
Swiss female equestrians
Swiss translators
Muhammad Ali dynasty
Egyptian Muslims
Royalty from Cairo
Egyptian emigrants to Switzerland
20th-century Swiss artists
20th-century translators
Daughters of kings